Mayte Sánchez González (born 1984) is a Panamanian model and Panamanian beauty queen.  She was elected Miss Panamá international 2006; this gave her the opportunity to compete in the Miss International 2006 pageant which was held in China. Finally she was 1st Runner-Up and won the Best National Costume.

Pageant participations

Señorita Panamá 2004

In 2004 participate in the Señorita Panamá 2004 where she place as 4th Runner-up, contest winner for Rosa María Hernández who participate in the Miss Universe 2005 (who in turn failed to enter the semifinals of Miss Universe 2005.

Miss International Panamá 2006

In the 2004 participate in the Miss International Panamá 2006 pageant and won the title and crowned by Lucía Matamoros.

Sánchez represented Panama  in the Miss International 2006 in Tokyo, Japan & Beijing, China finals was held on November 11, 2006, at Beijing Exhibition Centre, Beijing, China.

References

Miss International 2006 delegates
Living people
Panamanian beauty pageant winners
Señorita Panamá
1984 births